A leadership ballot in the Australian Labor Party, the opposition party in the Parliament of Australia, was held on 7 March 1960. It followed the retirement of previous leader H. V. Evatt. Calwell received 42 votes to Reg Pollard's 30 in a caucus ballot. Future Prime Minister Gough Whitlam would defeat Eddie Ward to become Calwell's deputy.

This marked the first time that the party elected a new leader which wasn't triggered by the death of an incumbent leader since the retirement of former Prime Minister James Scullin as leader in 1935.

Results

Leader
The following table gives the ballot results:

Deputy leader
The following table gives the ballot results:

References

Australian Labor Party leadership spills
Australian Labor Party leadership election